Stade Gaston-Petit is a multi-use stadium in Châteauroux, France.  It is currently used mostly for football matches and is the home stadium of La Berrichonne de Châteauroux. The stadium is able to hold 17,173 people.

Gaston Petit is a former player of the club.

References

Gaston Petit
Gaston Petit
Sports venues in Indre
Sports venues completed in 1964